Flippen is a surname of Dutch origin. Notable people with the surname include:

Benton Flippen (1920–2011), American old-time fiddler
Hannah Flippen (born 1995), American softball player
Jay C. Flippen (1899–1971), American actor
Ruth Brooks Flippen (1921–1981), American screenwriter and television writer
Samuel Flippen (1969–2006), American convicted murderer
Scott Stapp (born Anthony Scott Flippen), American musician and songwriter

References

Surnames of Dutch origin